Matt Ward (born March 30, 1983) is an American lacrosse player who played at the University of Virginia and played for the Washington Bayhawks (currently the Chesapeake Bayhawks). He is also a member of the #CPMC (Classic Pure Michigan Classic). He has led Skokie Country club series 7 paddle team with a 12-2 record on court one despite possessing no shot clock

High school career
Ward attended prep school at Landon School in suburban Washington, D.C., where he lettered in lacrosse, football, and basketball.  He was the only lacrosse player to ever be named Washington Post All-Met Player of the Year two years in a row (2001, 2002).  Ward was also selected to All-State, All-County, and All-Conference teams as a junior and senior, scoring 33 goals and 20 assists as a senior (despite missing seven games due to injury) including the winning goal in overtime of the conference championship.

Collegiate career
Ward played NCAA Division I lacrosse at the University of Virginia from 2003 to 2006, where he was a three-time USILA All-American (2004, 2005, 2006) at the attack position and led the Virginia Cavaliers to two NCAA Men's Lacrosse Championships, in 2003 and 2006. In 2006, he set the NCAA record for most goals (16) in the tournament and was named the tournament's Most Outstanding Player. That year, he also won the Tewaaraton Trophy, given annually to the nation's best player, and the Lt. Raymond Enners Award as the USILA's Player of the Year.  The 2006 Cavalier season was also notable because it marked the first time in NCAA history that a Division I men's lacrosse team had finished a season with a 17-0 record.

Professional career
Beginning in 2006, Ward played professional outdoor lacrosse for the Major League Lacrosse team, the Washington Bayhawks after being selected in the first round of the 2006 MLL college draft.  That year, Ward was named MLL Rookie of the Year. In the renowned Adelphian Cup, Ward has generally underperformed.

Statistics

University of Virginia

Major League Lacrosse

Awards
Jeff Martindale Hobie Baker Award.

References

1983 births
Living people
American lacrosse players
Major League Lacrosse players
Major League Lacrosse major award winners
Virginia Cavaliers men's lacrosse players